Turmequé is a town and municipality in the Colombian Department of Boyacá, part of the subregion of the Márquez Province. The municipality borders Ventaquemada in the west, in the east Úmbita, in the north Nuevo Colón and in the south the municipality Villapinzón of the department of Cundinamarca.

History 
Turmequé was an important center for the Muisca who inhabited the Altiplano Cundiboyacense before the arrival of the Spanish conquest led by Gonzalo Jiménez de Quesada, who founded modern Turmequé on July 20th, 1537 in his search for El Dorado. Turmequé was part of the Muisca Confederation led by the zaque based in Hunza, present-day department capital Tunja. The name of the village is Chibcha and means "vigorous chief". Another name for the town is Valle de las trompetas ("Trumpet Valley") because of the trumpets the Spanish conquistadores were bringing with them. Turmequé has given its name to the Colombian national game of tejo, previously called Turmequé. In the village center a statue honouring the Muisca sports god Chaquén still remembers this.

Before the municipality was split, it used to be extensive in area. In 1773 Villapinzón (then called Hato Viejo) became a separate unity and in 1776 Ventaquemada was separated from Turmequé.

Economy 
The town center is for the most part focused on commerce and services while the rural area has agriculture; potatoes, beans, maize, onions, peas, wheat, barley and fruits such as prunes, blackberries, pears and apples and the typical Colombian fruits curuba and feijoa. Livestock farming consists of mainly pork.

Tourism 
Being the birthplace of tejo, Turmequé has considerable amount of tourism. Each year the national championships of tejo are held here. The town also has a religious museum.

Gallery

See also 

 Chaquén - god of sports, tejo
 Diego de Torres y Moyachoque - mestizo cacique of Turmequé

References 

Municipalities of Boyacá Department
Populated places established in 1537
1537 establishments in the Spanish Empire
1537 disestablishments in the Muisca Confederation
Muysccubun